Rripë is a village in the former municipality of Gurrë, Albania. At the 2015 local government reform it became part of the municipality Klos.

References

Populated places in Klos (municipality)
Villages in Dibër County